Wolfgang Wiehle (born 20 October 1964) is a German politician for the Alternative for Germany (AfD) and a member of the Bundestag.

Life and politics

Wiehle was born 1964 in the German city of Munich and studied from 1982 to 1990 at the Technical University of Munich. He is a qualified IT specialist. Wiehle is member of the populist right-wing AfD and after the 2017 German federal election, he became a member of the Bundestag. Wiehle denies the scientific consensus on climate change.

References

Living people
1964 births
Politicians from Munich
Technical University of Munich alumni
Members of the Bundestag for Bavaria
Members of the Bundestag 2017–2021
Members of the Bundestag 2021–2025
Members of the Bundestag for the Alternative for Germany